Stilt houses (also called pile dwellings or lake dwellings) are houses raised on stilts (or piles) over the surface of the soil or a body of water. Stilt houses are built primarily as a protection against flooding; they also keep out vermin. The shady space under the house can be used for work or storage.

Arctic 

Houses where permafrost is present, in the Arctic, are built on stilts to keep permafrost under them from melting. Permafrost can be up to 70% water. While frozen, it provides a stable foundation. However, if heat radiating from the bottom of a home melts the permafrost, the home goes out of level and starts sinking into the ground. Other means of keeping the permafrost from melting are available, but raising the home off the ground on stilts is one of the most effective ways.

Indo-Pacific

 
Raised rectangular houses are one of the cultural hallmarks of the Austronesian peoples and are found throughout the regions in Island Southeast Asia, Island Melanesia, Micronesia, and Polynesia settled by Austronesians. The structures are raised on piles, usually with the space underneath also utilized for storage or domestic animals. The raised design had multiple advantages, they mitigate damage during flooding and (in very tall examples) can act as defensive structures during conflicts. The house posts are also distinctively capped with larger-diameter discs at the top, to prevent vermin and pests from entering the structures by climbing them. Austronesian houses and other structures are usually built in wetlands and alongside bodies of water, but can also be built in the highlands or even directly on shallow water.

Building structures on pilings is believed to be derived from the design of raised rice granaries and storehouses, which are highly important status symbols among the ancestrally rice-cultivating Austronesians. The rice granary shrine was also the archetypal religious building among Austronesian cultures and was used to store carvings of ancestor spirits and local deities. While rice cultivation wasn't among the technologies carried into Remote Oceania, raised storehouses still survived. The pataka of the Māori people is an example. The largest pataka are elaborately adorned with carvings and are often the tallest buildings in the Māori pā. These were used to store implements, weapons, ships, and other valuables; while smaller pataka were used to store provisions. A special type of pataka supported by a single tall post also had ritual importance and were used to isolate high-born children during their training for leadership.

The majority of Austronesian structures are not permanent. They are made from perishable materials like wood, bamboo, plant fiber, and leaves. Because of this, archaeological records of prehistoric Austronesian structures are usually limited to traces of house posts, with no way of determining the original building plans. Indirect evidence of traditional Austronesian architecture, however, can be gleaned from their contemporary representations in art, like in friezes on the walls of later Hindu-Buddhist stone temples (like in reliefs in Borobudur and Prambanan). But these are limited to the recent centuries. They can also be reconstructed linguistically from shared terms for architectural elements, like ridge-poles, thatch, rafters, house posts, hearth, notched log ladders, storage racks, public buildings, and so on. Linguistic evidence also makes it clear that stilt houses were already present among Austronesian groups since at least the Late Neolithic.

Arbi et al. (2013) have also noted the striking similarities between Austronesian architecture and Japanese traditional raised architecture (shinmei-zukuri). Particularly the buildings of the Ise Grand Shrine, which contrast with the pit-houses typical of the Neolithic Yayoi period. They propose significant Neolithic contact between the people of southern Japan and Austronesians or pre-Austronesians that occurred prior to the spread of Han Chinese cultural influence to the islands. Rice cultivation is also believed to have been introduced to Japan from a para-Austronesian group from coastal eastern China. Waterson (2009) has also argued that the architectural tradition of stilt houses in eastern Asia and the Pacific is originally Austronesian, and that similar building traditions in Japan and mainland Asia (notably among Kra-Dai and Austroasiatic-speaking groups) correspond to contacts with a prehistoric Austronesian network.

In South Asia, stilt houses are very common in Northeast India, specifically the Brahmaputra Valley regions of Assam, which is extremely prone to regional flooding from the Brahmaputra. These houses are known as chang ghar in Assamese, and as kare okum in Mising; chang ghar are traditionally built by the Mising people, who live along the Brahmaputra. Unlike many forms of traditional architecture, including stilt architecture, in South and Southeast Asia, the construction of chang ghar is making a resurgence and increasing in popularity, as a result of climate change increasing regular flooding in Assam, and the stilts of the chang ghar is adapted to flooding in the first place. The height of the stilts of the chang ghar is determined by the height of the water during the last major flood.

Stilt houses are also popular in Kerala in the Kerala Backwaters, another regions with high rainfall and regular flooding from monsoons. Although stilt houses in the Kerala Backwaters have been a traditional method of house construction for many years, following the disastrous 2018 floods in Kerala, many more stilt houses have been constructed recently and utilize concrete as well as timber for their pillars.

Stilt houses in China known as guījiǎfángwū because Chinese stilt house structures inspired from a turtle and built over water surface (e.g. rivers).

In the late 20th century, stilt houses in extremely calm ocean water became a popular form of tourist lodging known as overwater bungalows; the trend began in French Polynesia and quickly spread to other tourist locations, especially in tropical locales.

Americas

Stilt houses were also built by Amerindians in pre-Columbian times. Palafitos are especially widespread along the banks of the tropical river valleys of South America, notably the Amazon and Orinoco river systems. Stilt houses were such a prevalent feature along the shores of Lake Maracaibo that Amerigo Vespucci was inspired to name the region "Venezuela" (little Venice). As the costs of hurricane damage increase, more and more houses along the Gulf Coast are being built as or converted to stilt houses.

Stilt houses are also still common in parts of the Mosquito Coast in northeastern Nicaragua, and in northern Brazil as well as the bayou parts of the Southern United States.

Africa
Stilted granaries are also a common feature in West Africa, e.g., in the Malinke language regions of Mali and Guinea.

Europe 

In the Neolithic, the Copper Age and the Bronze Age, stilt-house settlements were common in the Alpine and Pianura Padana (Terramare) regions. Remains have been found at the Ljubljana Marsh in Slovenia and at the Mondsee and Attersee lakes in Upper Austria, for example.

Early archaeologists like Ferdinand Keller thought they formed artificial islands, much like the Irish and Scottish crannogs, but today it is clear that the majority of settlements were located on the shores of lakes and were only inundated later on.

Reconstructed stilt houses are shown in open-air museums in Unteruhldingen and Zürich (Pfahlbauland). In June 2011, the prehistoric pile dwellings in six Alpine states were designated as UNESCO World Heritage Sites. A single Scandinavian pile dwelling, the Alvastra stilt houses, has been excavated in Sweden. Herodotus has described in his Histories the dwellings of the "lake-dwellers" in Paeonia and how those were constructed.

In the Alps, similar buildings, known as raccards, are still in use as granaries. In England, granaries are placed on staddle stones, similar to stilts, to prevent mice and rats getting to the grain.

In Italy there are several stilt-houses settlements, for example the one on the Rocca di Manerba del Garda.

Types 
 Diaojiaolou – Stilt houses in southern China.
 Heliotrope – A concept house designed by Rolf Disch with a single stilt, optimized for harnessing solar power.
 Kelong – Built primarily for fishing, but often doubling up as offshore dwellings in the following countries: Philippines, Malaysia, Indonesia and Singapore.
 Bahay Kubo – The traditional house type prevalent in the Philippines.
 Palafito – Found throughout South America since Pre-Columbian times. In the late 19th century, numerous palafitos were built in Chilean cities such as Castro, Chonchi, and other towns in the Chiloé Archipelago, and are now considered a typical element of Chilotan architecture.
 Pang uk – A special kind of house found in Tai O, Lantau, Hong Kong, mainly built by Tankas.
 Papua New Guinea stilt house – A kind of stilt house constructed by Motuans, commonly found in the southern coastal area of PNG.
 Queenslander – Stilt house common in Queensland and northern New South Wales, Australia.
 Chaang Ghar – A type of stilt house built in Assam state of India. It is mainly found in flood-prone areas of the Brahmaputra river valley.
 Thai stilt house – A kind of house often built on freshwater, e.g., a lotus pond.
 Vietnamese stilt house – Similar to the Thai ones, except having a front door with a smaller height for religious reasons.

Tourism
Stilt houses as water villas are common in the Maldives and Assam.

Gallery

See also 
 Pfahlbaumuseum Unteruhldingen – an English-language article about the stilt house museum in Unteruhldingen, Germany
 Pit-house
 Post in ground
 Prehistoric pile dwellings around the Alps
 Rumah Melayu
 Stiltsville
 Treehouse
 Venice
 Wood pilings

References

External links

 
 View on OSM wiki

Coastal construction
House types